Mokeyevo is a rural locality (a village) in Vtorovskoye Rural Settlement, Kameshkovsky District, Vladimir Oblast, Russia. The population was 33 as of 2010.

Geography 
Mokeyevo is located 26 km southeast of Kameshkovo (the district's administrative centre) by road. Vorynino is the nearest rural locality.

References 

Rural localities in Kameshkovsky District